The Biao language (also known as Kang Bau or Kang Beu) is a Kra–Dai language (or perhaps three languages) spoken in southwestern Huaiji County and Fengkai County, Zhaoqing, Guangdong.

Speakers of this language are classified as part of Han Chinese ethnic groups.

Classification
Like Lakkia, the genetic affiliation of the Biao language within the Kra–Dai family is uncertain, although it could be a sister of the Kam–Sui languages. Hsiu (2014) suggests that Biao could either subgroup with Lakkia, or form an independent branch of Kra–Dai on its own.

Phonology
The tone categories and contour-tone values for three dialects of Biao are (Liang 2002: 53):

Dialects
There are three dialects of Biao (Hsiu 2014). The Shidong dialect is documented in detail by Liang (2002). Additional data from the Yonggu and Dagang dialects are documented by Hsiu (2014). A sketch of Yonggu Biao phonology is also documented in Lin (2009).
Shidong 诗洞
Yonggu 永固
Dagang 大岗

Norquest (2021) classifies the Biao dialects as follows.

Biao
Southern
Shidong 诗洞
Yonggu 永固
Northern
Dagang 大岗
Chang'an 长安

Yang (2012:73) provides the following lexical comparisons for five dialects of Biao.

Liang (2002: 53–55, 61–62) lists the following comparative data for three dialects of Biao.

Distribution
Varieties of Biao include the Shidong 诗洞, Yonggu 永固, Qiaotou 桥头, and Dagang 大岗 dialects (Liang 2002:3). In Fengkai County, it is spoken in Chang'an 长安, Jinzhuang 金装, and Qixing 七星. The Fengshan County Gazetteer (1998) reports that in Fengkai County, Biao (piau42) is spoken by 7,217 people in 48 natural villages in Chang'an 长安, Baoshan 宝山, and Dongshan 东山 townships. Fengkai Biao is reported by the Fengshan County Gazetteer (1998) to be a distinct dialect from Biao of Huaiji County. Yang (2011) reports that Biao is also spoken in Liandu 莲都 and He'erkou 河儿口镇 in Fengkai County, and Shatian 沙田镇, Hezhou, Guangxi. Comparative lexical data for 4 varieties of Biao spoken in Shatian Town, Hezhou (namely Fanglin 芳林, Dapan 大盘, Qiaotou 桥头, and Guishan 桂山) are provided in Chen & Yang (2011: 99-100).

Yang (2010)
According to Yang Biwan (2010), there are more than 160,000 speakers of Biao.
Huaiji County
Shidong Township 诗洞镇 (16 villages): 55,000 speakers. Baiya 白崖话 is spoken in Jianfeng 健丰, Jinsha 金沙, and Feng'an 丰安.
Yonggu Township 永固镇 (all 12 villages in the township): 40,000 speakers
Qiaotou Township 桥头镇 (3 villages): 10,000 speakers
Xinning 新宁: Tansi 潭泗, Rongling 榕岭
Xinping 新平: Jinji 金鸡, Gongxian 公弦, Dahekou 大和口, Songgenling 松根岭, Doushui 斗水
Hongguang 红光: Guihua 桂花, Zhiwu 植屋, Wanghaotang 旺豪塘, Tanxing 谭杏
Small numbers scattered in Jiuxu of Jinxing 金星旧墟, Anshe of Baofeng 保丰安社, Liuhua of Fengzhen 凤真六化
Dagang Township 大岗镇 (12 villages): 30,000 speakers. Xiafang 下坊话 is spoken in Shiqun 石群 and Sibao 四保.
Dihou 地厚 (all villages)
Liangshui 梁水 (all villages)
Fulou 富楼: Laochen 老陈, Laoxuan 老禤, Jian'gang 坚岗, Linwu 林屋, Shangcaitang 上彩塘, Xiacaitang 下彩塘
Tanzhu 谭珠: Dongxiang 东向, Taiping 太平, Liwu 李屋, Tangmei 塘美, Liuwu 刘屋, Tansha 谭沙, Sanwu 三屋
Xiulin 秀林: Baiwu 白屋, Linghui 岭惠, Langwei 浪尾, Bitang 碧塘, Hanggen 杭根, Shankou 山口, Zhuyuan 竹园, Rongshu 榕树, Fenglin 枫林, Xiulin 秀林, Pangmei 庞眉, Xiaguo 下郭
Shangting 上亭: Guowu 郭屋, Benji 本吉, Sanzhong 三中, Shegang 社岗, Zhuwu 朱屋, Hongshu 红树
Shitian 石田: Niewu 聂屋, Liancun 连村, Qidou 七斗
Linggang 岭岗: Shangzhai 上寨, Zhiling 知岭, Fenshui 坟水
Dazhong 大钟: Qilong 奇龙, Lianhui 连会, Baishi 白石, Miaozhong 庙中, Ejing 鹅劲, Miaoshang 庙上
Shangshi 上石: Fujing 富井, Zhongxinwu 中心屋, Shenshui 深水, Zhongxindong 中心洞, Yangshu 杨树, Shanggaowu 上高屋, Lezhai 勒寨
Jiyi 集义: Shuangxi 双溪, Tanbian 谭变, Shuangshimiao 双狮庙
Tanying 谭英: Muyuan 木园, Xiazhai 下寨, Guantang 关塘, Kangen 榄根, Liangwu 梁屋
Liangcun Township 梁村镇 (7 villages): 18,000 speakers. Xiafang 下坊话 is spoken in Liyang 李样 and Linwu 林屋.
Zhenwu 镇武 (all villages)
Xiangtian 湘田 (all villages)
Shatian 沙田: Matou 码头, Xinlou 新楼, Bailong 白龙, Dacheng 大成, Huangtang 黄塘, Tanle 谭了
Guangming 光明: Tanpin 谭聘, Mumian 木棉, Luokong 罗孔, Datian 大田, Nan'an 南安, Beixiang 北向, Dongxiang 东向, Nanxiang 南向
Liangcun 梁村: Huilonggang 回龙岗, Tanyuan 谭园
Yongyou 永攸: Xiayou 下攸, Xixiang 西向
Lanma 栏马: Lanzhong 栏中, Baiwu 白屋, Sanzhe 三折, Nansheao 南蛇凹, Dasonggen 大松根, Taiping 太平
Fengkai County
Chang'an Township 长安镇 (3 villages): 7,000 speakers
Chang'an 长安 (80% of villages)
Dongshan 东山 (all villages)
Baoshan 宝山: Xialuochai 下罗柴, Wenlin 文林, Shandong 上东 (Dongdui 东队), Shangxi 上西 (Xidui 西队), Qiaotou 桥头, Jiongzhou 迥週, Sushui 宿水, Fankou 范口, Dakou 大口
Liandu Township 莲都镇 (4 villages): 1,300 speakers; ancestors from Shidong.
Sicun 四村: Shuilai 水来
Qingshui 清水: Yangmei 杨梅, Zhongxin 中心, Yonggu 涌谷, Pangu 盘古, Datang 大塘, Tongyou 桐油, Luoya 罗雅, Dajiang 大降
Shendi 深底: Yingxiong 英雄, Kengjiao 坑脚, Heliping 合理坪
Yuntang 云塘: Dalang 大浪
He'erkou Township 河儿口镇 (4 villages): 1,750 speakers; ancestors from Shidong.
Dongguan 东光 (3 natural villages)
Xiangyang 向阳 (all villages)
Sandong 三洞 (20% of villages)
Pingdong 平洞 (all villages)
Hezhou
Shatian Township 沙田镇 (4 villages): 20 elderly speakers; ancestors from Shidong.
Cluster 9 of Qiaotou 桥头第9组
Sanzhen of Dapan 大盘三圳
Clusters 3 and 4 of Guishan 桂山第3、4组
Cluster 11 of Fanglin 芳林第11组

Yang (2012) notes that toponyms in Yonggu 永固 Township with the name “Luo 罗”, and toponyms in Shidong 诗洞 Township with “Liu 六”, “Feng 凤”, and “Nan 南” are of Biao origin.

References

Chen Caijia 陈才佳; Yang Biwan 杨璧菀. 2011. Hezhou binwei Biaohua fangyandao yanjiu 贺州濒危标话方言岛研究. Journal of Original Ecological National Culture 原生态民族文化学刊 2011(2):96-104. 
 Hsiu, Andrew. 2014. The Biao languages of northwestern Guangdong, China. Presented at SEALS 24, Yangon University, Yangon, Myanmar. (PPT slides) 
 Liang, Min [梁敏]. 2002. A Study of Biao [标话硏究]. Beijing: Minzu University Press [中央民族大学出版社].
 Yang, Biwan [杨璧菀] (2011). "The origins of Biao speakers" [讲标人的来源]. Minzu Yuwen. http://www.cnki.com.cn/Article/CJFDTotal-WZGZ201101028.htm
 Yang, Biyu [杨璧菀]; Zeng, Lin [曾霖]. 2017. Huaiji (Biaohua) [怀集(标话)]. Zhongguo yuyan wenhua diancang [中国语言文化典藏] series. Beijing: The Commercial Press. . [illustrated dictionary of material culture]

Languages of China
Kra–Dai languages
Guangdong